Rev. Ernest R. Atwater (c. 1860–1898) was a Congregational minister and missionary to China. He was married to Jennie Pond Atwater (1865–96), who died while in the China mission with her husband.  In the Boxer Rebellion, Rev. Atwater, his four children by Jennie, Ernestine (1889–1900), Mary (1892–1900), Celia (circa 1894–??), and Bertha (1896–??), and Ernest's second wife, Elizabeth Graham Atwater were all killed.

Sources
 Our Jennie: Jennie Pond Atwater, by Rev. Chauncey Northrop Pond, Memorial pamphlet published in 1896.

1860s births
1898 deaths
American Congregationalist ministers
American Congregationalist missionaries
American Christian theologians
Place of birth missing
American expatriates in China
Congregationalist missionaries in China
19th-century American clergy